Feel My Pain is the third latest studio album with new material from the band Battlezone, with ex-Iron Maiden singer, Paul Di'Anno.

The album was released in 1998, 10 years after the collection Warchild was released.

Track listing
"Feel My Pain" - 5:27
"C.O.M. '98" - 6:31
"Victim" - 3:44
"The Forgotten Ones" - 6:37
"Push" - 4:25
"Snake Eyes (Ode to...?)" - 5:50
"Smack" - 6:24
"The Black" - 5:51
"Fear Part 1" - 5:32

Personnel

Band members
Paul Di'Anno - lead vocals
John Wiggins - guitar
Paulo Turin - guitar, backing vocals
Colin Riggs - bass, backing vocals
Mark Angel - drums
Attila     - Keyboards, backing vocals

Additional musicians
Nick Beere, Nicky James - backing vocals

Production
Nick Beere - producer, engineer

References

Paul Di'Anno albums
1998 albums

no:Di'Anno